The 1911 Tie Cup Final was the final match to decide the winner of the Tie Cup, the 12th. edition of the international competition organised by the Argentine and Uruguayan Associations together. The final was contested by Argentine San Isidro and Uruguayan Wanderers,

In the match, played at Estadio G.E.B.A. in Belgrano, Wanderers won its first Tie Cup after beating San Isidro (which played its first final) 2–0.

Qualified teams

Overview 

San Isidro earned its place in the final after having won the 1911 Copa de Competencia Jockey Club, where the squad beat San Isidro (3–0), Quilmes (4–0), and Estudiantes de Buenos Aires in the final (4–2 at Racing Club Stadium). The match was held in Gimnasia y Esgrima Stadium in Palermo on October 1, 1911.

In a game fiercely disputed, Wanderers opened the score on 38 minutes when goalkeeper Carlos Tomás Wilson intercepted the ball before winger C. Riss advanced to the goal, throwing it away. Nevertheless, Rébori caught the ball and shot to the goal before Wilson could go back.

In the second half, Wanderers scored again on 34 minutes when Bastos made a long pass after dribbling Malbrán and Olivari. The ball came to Costa who shot for the second goal to secure the result. Thus, Wanderers won its first Tie Cup, which was also the first time an Uruguayan side won the final.

Match details

References

T
1911 in Argentine football
1911 in Uruguayan football
Football in Buenos Aires